Edmund Perry, a Harlem resident, was shot to death by Lee Van Houten, a 24-year-old plainclothes policeman, on June 12, 1985 when he was 17 years old. The case briefly generated a firestorm of protest in New York City when it was revealed that Perry was an honor student and was enrolled to attend Stanford on a scholarship; however, Van Houten said that Perry and his brother had attempted to mug him, and the shooting was ruled justifiable.

The incident
Lee Van Houten, a 24-year-old plainclothes policeman, was on assignment in the Morningside Park section of Manhattan on the night of June 12, 1985, when he said he was assaulted by two men who attempted to mug him. According to Van Houten, he was approached from behind and yanked to the ground by his neck, where two black men beat him and demanded that he give them money. He drew his gun from his ankle holster and fired three times, hitting Edmund Perry in the abdomen. The other attacker fled, and was later identified as Jonah Perry, Edmund's brother.

Reaction
At the time of his death, Perry was a recent graduate of Phillips Exeter Academy in Exeter, New Hampshire, one of the most prestigious preparatory schools in the United States. The revelation of this fact led to significant press coverage, much of it unfavorable to the police. The front-page headline of the New York Post the next day was "COP KILLS HARLEM HONOR STUDENT". The Village Voice suggested that Perry was shot because he was "too black for his own good", and The New York Times wrote that "...the death of Edmund Perry raises painfully troubling questions".

However, 2 witnesses backed up Van Houten's version of events, and the media firestorm was short-lived. Van Houten was cleared of any culpability in the shooting. Jonah Perry, an alumnus of the Westminster School in Simsbury, Connecticut, was later put on trial for assaulting Van Houten. He was found not guilty. The NYPD settled a wrongful death claim for $75,000 in 1989. Veronica Perry, the mother of both boys and their sister Nicol, died in the city six years later on October 22, 1991, of a heart attack aged 44.

In popular culture
Perry's experiences at Exeter and the circumstances surrounding his death formed the basis of the best-selling 1987 book Best Intentions: The Education and Killing of Edmund Perry, written by Robert Sam Anson.

On January 6, 1992, NBC aired the TV movie Murder Without Motive: The Edmund Perry Story, directed by Kevin Hooks. Perry was portrayed by Curtis McClarin.

Spike Lee's movie Do the Right Thing is dedicated to Edmund Perry, among others.

The first-season episode of Law & Order, "Poison Ivy" was inspired by Perry.

Various Michael Jackson biographers have concluded his 1987 song "Bad" and its music video were inspired by Edmund Perry. In the music video Michael's character is peer-pressured by his friends when he returns home from his honors high school and rebuffs his bullies by singing the song. This reflects the main lyrical theme of anti-bullying and standing up for oneself.

Adrienne Rich's poem Yom Kippur 1984 contains a line about the killing of Edmund Perry: "young scholar shot at the university gates on a summer evening walk, his prizes and studies nothing, nothing availing his Blackness."

References

Further reading 
Anson, Robert Sam. Best Intentions: The Education and Killing of Edmund Perry
Castro, Janice. Shattering a Fragile Dream." Time Magazine. July 15, 1985
Butler, Leonard. Police Say Others Saw Student Attack Officer. New York Times. June 15, 1985
Kunen, James A. In a Troubling Tale of Two Cities, a Policeman's Bullet Kills a Promising Prep School Honor Student People Magazine. July 22, 1985
Farber, M.A. Jonah Perry Acquitted of Mugging Officer Who Fatally Shot Brother New York Times. January 23, 1986
Farber, M.A. For Many Jurors, Little was Proved in Perry Case New York Times. January 26, 1986
McFadden, Robert D. Settlement Reached in Perry Wrongful-Death Suit New York Times. May 13, 1989
Garrity, Patrick. Lessons to learn from the life and death of Eddie Perry '85. Philips Exeter Academy. June 11, 2020.

External links 

1967 births
1985 deaths
African-American history in New York City
People from Harlem
Phillips Exeter Academy alumni
African Americans shot dead by law enforcement officers in the United States
1985 in New York City
Race-related controversies in the United States
New York City Police Department corruption and misconduct
Incidents of violence against boys